The Billboard Hot 100 is a chart that ranks the best-performing singles of the United States. Published by Billboard magazine, the data are compiled by Nielsen SoundScan based collectively on each single's weekly physical sales and airplays. The year started out with "One Sweet Day" by Mariah Carey and Boyz II Men and ended with "Un-Break My Heart" by Toni Braxton. There were nine singles that peaked atop the charts, but if "One Sweet Day" is excluded from the count (as the song had its peak in the previous year), the total would be eight, the second lowest for a single year, along with 2005 and 2015. The longest running number-one single of 1996 is "Macarena" (Bayside Boys Mix), which stayed at the top for 14 weeks.

That year, 8 acts earned their first number one song, such as Bone Thugs-n-Harmony, 2Pac, K-Ci & JoJo, Dr. Dre, Roger Troutman, Toni Braxton, Los del Río, and Blackstreet. Mariah Carey, Dr. Dre and Toni Braxton were the only acts to hit number one more than once, with each of them hitting number one twice.

Chart history

Number-one artists

See also
1996 in music
List of Billboard number-one singles

References

Additional sources
Fred Bronson's Billboard Book of Number 1 Hits, 5th Edition
Joel Whitburn's Top Pop Singles 1955-2008, 12 Edition
Joel Whitburn Presents the Billboard Hot 100 Charts: The Nineties
Additional information obtained can be verified within Billboard's online archive services and print editions of the magazine.

United States Hot 100
1996